Ernest James Hayford,  (23 April 1858, Anomabu – 6 August 1913, London) was a physician and lawyer in the Gold Coast. He was the second African in the Gold Coast to become an orthodox medical doctor after Benjamin Quartey-Papafio.

Life
Ernest James Hayford was the eldest son of the Rev. Joseph de Graft Hayford, a Methodist minister and Mary Brew. J. E. Casely Hayford and Mark Christian Hayford were his younger brothers. He was educated at Anomabu, at Cape Coast, and at the Wesleyan High School at Freetown, Sierra Leone.

He became an assistant missionary and head teacher at the Wesleyan Methodist church and school in Elmina, and headmaster of Cape Coast Government Boys School in 1882. After private medical study from 1882 to 1884, he studied medicine at St Thomas' Hospital in London from 1884 to 1888. Specializing in gynaecology at the Rotunda Hospital in Dublin, he returned to private practice in Cape Coast.

An executive member of the Gold Coast Aborigines' Rights Protection Society, his interest in politics led him to study law privately and then at Lincoln's Inn in London from 1910 to 1913. Called to the Bar in June 1913, he died in London later that summer.

Hayford married several times: there is written documentation of two marriages – to Anna Vitringa Coulon (c.1855–1912), daughter of Julius Vitringa Coulon, and Maria Hoogen (1835–1916) – and oral tradition of three other marriages. There were children from all marriages and from another relationship. All of his descendants are members of what is known as the Casely-Hayford family.

References

1858 births
1913 deaths
Fante people
Ghanaian Freemasons
Ghanaian gynaecologists
Ghanaian Methodists
Ghanaian people of English descent
Ghanaian people of Irish descent
Members of Lincoln's Inn
People from Central Region (Ghana)
Ernest
Gold Coast (British colony) people